Douglas Don Stang (born May 4, 1974) is an American politician in the state of Minnesota. He served in the Minnesota House of Representatives from 1997 to 2004 under the Republican Party. Stang lived in Cold Spring, Minnesota with his family and graduated from Rocori High School in Cold Spring, Minnesota. He graduated from College of Saint Benedict and Saint John's University in 1996.

References

Republican Party members of the Minnesota House of Representatives
1974 births
Living people
People from Stearns County, Minnesota
College of Saint Benedict and Saint John's University alumni